System Express is a compilation album by dance/ambient band System 7 with remixes of tracks from their first four studio albums, including seven completely new mixes. A limited UK edition came with a bonus CD EP of two additional remixes.

Track listing

Mixed CD / Unmixed 3LP 
 (BFLCD21, AAWCD005) (BFLLP 21)

Tracks 1, 3, 9 and 10 had been previously released, track 1 is here shortened from its original 19 minute length. Tracks 8 and 11 were released on a promotional 12" in August 1996.

Bonus CD 
 (BLFCDL21, included as a bonus in BFLCD21X)

Both tracks had been previously released.

References

External links 

 System Express • discography on the official System 7 website

1996 compilation albums
System 7 (band) albums